Vuk Milošević (born 30 November 1987) is a Montenegrin handball player who plays for the Romanian club SCM Politehnica Timișoara.

Individual awards
 Serie A - 1ª Divisione Nazionale Top Scorer: 2013

Personal life
He is the son of Pero Milošević.

References

1987 births
Living people
Montenegrin male handball players
Sportspeople from Šabac
Montenegrin expatriate sportspeople in Spain
Montenegrin expatriate sportspeople in Italy
Montenegrin expatriate sportspeople in Qatar
Montenegrin expatriate sportspeople in Turkey
Montenegrin expatriate sportspeople in Romania
Expatriate handball players